Mary Nimmo Moran (May 16, 1842 – September 25, 1899) was an American 19th-century landscape printmaker, specializing in etchings. The first woman to prove "marriage and family were not insurmountable to success." She was the first of many landscape artists and in 1880 she was known as a landscape etcher. She completed roughly 70 landscape etchings, which included scenes of England and Scotland, as well as Long Island, New York; New Jersey, Florida, and Pennsylvania. In 1881, she was one of eight Americans and the first female elected as a fellow to London's Royal Society of Painter-Etchers. Mary Nimmo Moran's landscape View of Newark from the Meadows is in the collection of The Newark Museum of Art. She was among the earliest American Artists to explore the medium of etching.

Born in Scotland, she immigrated to the United States at the age of five with her widowed father and brother; they settled in Philadelphia. She married American artist and illustrator Thomas Moran, and they had a family together.

Biography

Mary Nimmo was born in Strathaven, Scotland on May 16, 1842 to Mary and Archibald Nimmo, a family of weavers. The town of Strathaven was one of many where hand-loomed and colorful wools from weavers were the main source of livelihood for the community. Following, the death of her mother in 1847, when Mary was five, her father, Archibald,  took her and her brother with him to the United States, settling in Crescentville, Philadelphia, Pennsylvania in 1858. In 1860 she began studying art at the Pennsylvania Academy of the Fine Arts  with her neighbor Thomas Moran, who was gaining a local reputation as an artist.

In 1862, the couple married and moved to Philadelphia, where they had two daughters and a son together. Their son Paul Nimmo Moran was born in 1864 and their first daughter, Mary Scott, was born in 1868, and their third daughter, Ruth Bedford, was born in 1870.

In 1866, the Morans traveled to Europe to study the artworks there. They had a brief stay in England. Then they moved to France and in Paris, they took a studio for nine months near the Luxembourg gardens. She painted the street scenes of Paris and did sketching of the Fontainebleau and the Seine Valley. They then went to Italy and were charmed by the ancient city of Baise. They moved throughout Italy and some of the places they stayed or visited were Rome, Florence, Bologna, and Milan, and sketched Lake Como. They went through St. Gotthard and passed through the Alps and then proceeded back to Paris. In 1872 they moved to Newark, New Jersey. Mary recorded a view of the Hackensack Meadows which was an oil painting. It was created in 1879 and it was called Newark from the Meadows which was one of the earliest depictions of the industrial scene in America.

She took up painting to be a better companion to her husband on many of his sketching trips which she used watercolor and oil painting and then in 1879, her husband introduced Nimmo Moran to the technique of etching by directly working on a copper plate. Her first etching was a Florida landscape, which she created from a memory of a family trip in 1877. She made most of her etchings on location near her various homes, as responsibilities to her growing family strongly limited her travel. Her paintings and etching are directly about nature which can be seen in her artwork.  Etching became her favorite type of medium to use. Her etchings earned critical praise for their directness and boldness because they were so different.

The New York Etching Club invited the Morans to submit their artwork for an American presentation at the international exhibition of the newly organized Royal Society of the Painter-Etchers. Mary exhibited four etchings which included: Easthampton, Barnes, L.I.; An Old Homestead at Easthampton; Long Island: Solitude; and Long Island Twilight. She was the only woman among the 65 original fellows.

She was elected to the Society of Painter-Etchers of New York in 1879. In 1881, she was invited along with her husband to become a member of the Royal Society of Painters and Etchers of Great Britain and she was able to exhibit and showcase her work. She was the only woman among the 65 original fellows chosen for London's Royal Society of Painter-Etchers. Her prints were recognized for their boldness and originality and were collected by the British critic John Ruskin among others. She was a frequent exhibitor of the American Society of Painters and Etchers. Mary Nimmo Moran often signed her etchings "M. Nimmo Moran" or "M. N. Moran", leading many people, including the membership committees, to believe she was a male artist. Her etchings earned critical praise for their directness and boldness.

The Moran family relocated to Newark, New Jersey in 1872. In June 1881, they moved to New York City. Mary was able to use the city as an inspiration and capture the transition of the city. In 1882, the Moran family decided to do another trip to England and Scotland. Mary was able to do some artwork there and one of them was Cochrane's O'The Craig-Strathaven, which was an ode to the town she was born. In 1884 they moved to East Hampton, Long Island. This town became the subject of many of Nimmo Moran's most successful etchings. The Moran home in East Hampton became the center of a productive artists' colony and is today designated as a National Historic Landmark. It is also a contributing property to the East Hampton Village District, a historic district listed on the National Register of Historic Places.

Her paintings were exhibited sporadically at the National Academy of Design. It was presented at the Society of American Artists from 1879-1899 at the Pennsylvania Academy of the Fine Arts.

Fifty-four of her etchings were presented in a Mammoth Exhibition of Women Printmakers at the Museum of Fine Arts in Boston from November 1 through December 31, 1887.

Nimmo Moran exhibited her work at the Woman's Building at the 1893 World's Columbian Exposition in Chicago, Illinois.

Nimmo Moran was described as simultaneously charming, personable, bright, modest, and humble. Notably, she was well-versed in many different fields of artistry.

In the summer of 1950, her etchings were presented at the Smithsonian Institution in Washington D.C.

Death
Moran died of typhoid fever in 1899, after nursing her daughter Ruth through the disease. She was buried beside Goose Pond, a subject of many of her etchings, near her home in East Hampton.

Auction record
On 9 June 2011, Swann Galleries auctioned Mary Nimmo Moran's Long Island Landscape, an 1880 oil on panel, which was her first painting to appear at auction. It sold for $64,800.

Artworks

Gallery 

The Goose Pond of East Hampton is an important work of Mary Nimmo Moran because their home in East Hampton overlooked a Goose Pond. It became her inspiration in the flat grassy terrain and abundant waterways. She used the delicate line of the etching needle to describe the pond that cuts the composition in half. She included a Gardiner's Mill which was a typical landmark of 18th-century Dutch etching. The movement of the clouds is something challenging in general when doing etching but she was able to create a special effect in this etching which was something that was not seen and it was different for that period.

A Glimpse of Conway was created during her visit to Europe in 1882 with her husband Thomas Moran. It was etched on a copper plate on-site and outdoors which could have been her preference. The girl in the etching might have been a little girl walking and Nimmo Moran could have imagined herself in a young version. The trip was a homecoming trip since she is from Scotland. An interesting thing about the etching is that the little girl in the etching is more focused on the water than the medieval castle behind which can bring up the idea that some things are more important than others.

References

 Wilkins, Thurman, Caroline L. Hinkley, William H. Goetzmann, Thomas Moran: Artist of the Mountains, University of Oklahoma Press, 1998; .

External links

 Artworks by Mary Nimmo Moran
 
 The Francis Collection on Mary Nimmo Moran at the National Museum of Women in the Arts

1842 births
1889 deaths
19th-century engravers
19th-century British women artists
Deaths from typhoid fever
Landscape artists
Scottish engravers
Women engravers